The 1987–88 Florida Gators men's basketball team represented the University of Florida during the 1987–88 NCAA men's basketball season.

Roster

Schedule

Rankings

References

Florida Gators men's basketball seasons
Florida
Florida
Florida Gators
Florida Gators